A gubernatorial election was held in Jakarta on 11 July 2012, with a second round run-off on 20 September 2012 to elect the governor of Jakarta for the next five-year term. Incumbent governor Fauzi Bowo was running for a second successive term.

The first round resulted with two top-voted candidates, Joko Widodo and Fauzi Bowo to advance to the runoff as neither received majority of votes in the first round. Quick count results released in mass media after the second round voting indicated that Joko Widodo is projected to win the runoff with 54% of popular votes. Fauzi Bowo later conceded and congratulated Joko on 17.00 WIB. Official results were announced on 29 September. Widodo won the election with 53.82% of votes against Bowo's 46.18%.

Candidates 
Under regulations, only political parties having 15 seats or more in the regional parliament (DPRD) can put forward a candidate. Political parties with fewer seats can put forward a candidate only if they have acquired support from other political parties. Independent candidates are able to run if they have gathered at least 407,340 signatures from local residents, which will be verified by the local election committee.

Candidates that declared their candidacy:
 Fauzi Bowo, running with Nachrowi Ramli, endorsed by PD, PKB, PAN, Hanura, plus a faction in PDS.
 Joko Widodo, running with Basuki Cahaya Purnama, endorsed by PDI-P and Gerindra.
 Alex Noerdin, running with Nono Sampono, endorsed by Golkar, PPP, and a faction in PDS.
 Hidayat Nur Wahid, running with Didik Rachbini, endorsed by PKS.
 Faisal Basri, running with Biem Benyamin, independent candidate.
 Hendarji Supanji, running with Ahmad Riza Patria, independent candidate.

Parties endorsing Noerdin and Nur Wahid in the first round later gave their support to Fauzi in the second round.

Campaign and issues 
While the campaign for the elections had been mostly peaceful, there were a wide range of issues carried into the campaign. Notable ones including traffic management, flood control, accusation of money politics by some candidates, electoral roll irregularities, and smear campaign dominated the campaign.

Traffic management 
Traffic has long become the main issue for many Jakartans. Traffic jams up to 3–5 hours happens during weekdays rush hour and frustrate many locals. Public transportation was also heavily lamented due to poor service and maintenance. All candidates in the race brought forward this issue and promised various approaches to this problem.

Money politics 
Money politics is a problem that has marred the democratic process in Indonesia ever since the transition to democracy. There have been many cases of candidates giving money or other incentives to the electorate to influence their voting intention. In the first round of this election, anti-corruption NGO, Indonesia Corruption Watch found at least 27 cases of money politics during the campaign. The campaign of incumbent governor Fauzi Bowo was the main offender with 12 cases, followed by Alex Noerdin's campaign with 6 cases. The electoral commission was also deemed failed to avoid these cases to happen regularly.

Electoral roll irregularities 
The electoral roll (Daftar Pemilih Tetap) had created much controversy since it was made public. The roll which approved by the electoral commission on June 2, was rejected by all candidates except the incumbent governor. Irregularities include double registrations, inclusion of deceased voters, fake names, or redundancy. Since then, all five candidates appealed the electoral commission to revise the electoral roll, and if necessary, postpone the election. The electoral commission mostly kept silent on this issue and promised to do some revision on the roll. The revision process was controversially ineffective and was heavily criticized. The head of the commission was reprimanded for this issue.

Results

First round 
Preliminary results released by several media after first round of elections showed Joko Widodo leading with 43% of votes, followed by Fauzi Bowo with 33%, Hidayat Nur Wahid with 11%, Faisal Basri with 5%, Alex Noerdin with 4%, and Hendarji Supanji with 2%. Official results were released on 19 July. The result has shocked every single pollsters, as most have predicted Gov. Fauzi to win the election in a landslide and without having to go for a runoff.

Second round 
Quick count results released in mass media after the second round voting indicated that Joko Widodo is projected to win with 54% of popular votes. Fauzi Bowo congratulated Joko at 17.00 WIB. Official second round results were released on 29 September.

Table 

|- bgcolor="#E9E9E9" align="center"
! colspan="2" rowspan="2" align="left" | Candidates
! rowspan="2" colspan="2" align="left" | Parties
! colspan="2" | 1st round
! colspan="2" | 2nd round
|- bgcolor="#E9E9E9" align="center"
! width="75" | Votes
! width="30" | %
! width="75" | Votes
! width="30" | %
|-
| bgcolor="" |
| align="left" | Joko Widodo
| align="left" | Indonesian Democratic Party – Struggle (Partai Demokrasi Indonesia-Perjuangan)
| PDI-P
| 
| %
| 
| %
|-
| bgcolor="" |
| align="left" | Fauzi Bowo
| align="left" | Democratic Party (Partai Demokrat)
| PD
| 
| % 
| 
| %
|-
| bgcolor="" |
| align="left" | Hidayat Nur Wahid
| align="left" | Prosperous Justice Party (Partai Keadilan Sejahtera)
| PKS
| 
| %
| colspan="2" rowspan="4" bgcolor="#E9E9E9" |
|-
| bgcolor="" |
| align="left" | Faisal Basri
| align="left" | Independent
| Ind
| 
| %
|-
| bgcolor="" |
| align="left" | Alex Noerdin
| align="left" | Golongan Karya (Partai Golkar)
| PG
| 
| %
|-
| bgcolor="" |
| align="left" | Hendardji Supandji
| align="left" | Independent
| Ind
| 
| %
|-
| colspan="8" bgcolor="#E9E9E9" |
|-
! colspan="4" align="left" | Total
! 
! 100%
! 
! 100%
|-
| colspan="8" bgcolor="#E9E9E9" | 
|-
| colspan="4" align="left" | Valid votes
|  || %
|  || %
|-
| colspan="4" align="left" | Spoilt and null votes
|  || %
|  || %
|-
| colspan="4" align="left" | Turnout
|  || %
|  || %
|-
| colspan="4" align="left" | Abstentions
|  || %
|  || %
|-
| colspan="4" align="left" | Registered voters
| 
| bgcolor="#E9E9E9" |
| 
| bgcolor="#E9E9E9" |
|-
| colspan="8" bgcolor="#E9E9E9" | 
|-
| colspan="8" align="left" | Source: Electoral Commission of Jakarta (first round), Electoral Commission of Jakarta (second round)
|}

References 

Elections in Jakarta
2012 Indonesian gubernatorial elections
2010s in Jakarta
July 2012 events in Asia
September 2012 events in Asia